Model Town C-Block Ground is a multi-use stadium in Lahore, Pakistan. It is currently used mostly football games and used to host the home matches of WAPDA FC. The stadium holds 3,000 people.

External links

Football venues in Pakistan
Model Town, Lahore